The George Washington Bridge Bus Station is a commuter bus terminal located at the east end of the George Washington Bridge in the Washington Heights area of Manhattan in New York City. The bus station is owned and operated by the Port Authority of New York and New Jersey. On a typical weekday, approximately 20,000 passengers on about 1,000 buses use the station.

The building, an example of 1960s urban renewal, has been described as a blight on its surrounding environment and "a brutal assault on the senses". Its upper-level bus ramps cross Fort Washington Avenue, blocking light and the view of the George Washington Bridge. While noting the station's neglect from decades of deferred maintenance, the architecture critic Ada Louise Huxtable heralded the design of the station as "a work of the first rank that demonstrates the art and science of reinforced concrete construction at its 20th-century highpoint, in the hands of one of its greatest masters."

Although scheduled to be completed in early 2015, the renovated station reopened on May 16, 2017, two years behind schedule, $17 million over budget, and still unfinished.

Description

The station is built over the Trans-Manhattan Expressway (Interstate 95) between 178th and 179th Streets and Fort Washington and Wadsworth Avenues, and features direct bus ramps on and off the upper level of the bridge. 

The building was designed by noted Italian engineer Pier Luigi Nervi and is one of only a few buildings he designed outside of Italy. It opened on January 17, 1963 as a replacement for a series of sidewalk bus loading areas that existed between 166th and 167th streets further south. The building is constructed of huge steel-reinforced concrete trusses, fourteen of which are cantilevered from supports in the median of the Trans-Manhattan Expressway, which it straddles. The building contains murals as well as busts of George Washington and Othmar Amman, the civil engineer who designed the bridge. The building received the 1963 Concrete Industry Board’s Award.

The building's roof trusses have been described as resembling butterflies, as seen in aerial views. 
The entire facility is wheelchair-accessible.

Renovation
A renovation of the terminal began in late 2013, after years of delays. It was expected to cost . The project was a partnership between the Port Authority and a private company known as GWBBS Development Venture, LLC. Tutor Perini received a $100 million construction contract in August 2013.

The renovated building was to be improved with better access to local subway stops, displays of bus departure and arrival times, central air conditioning, and full ADA-compliant accessibility to those with disabilities.

The renovated station reopened on May 16, 2017, two years behind schedule, $17 million over budget, and still unfinished. The contractor Tutor Perini has filed a $120 million lawsuit against the Port Authority over "delays and cost overruns" incurred on the project.

Subway connection
The complex is served by the 175th Street station of the New York City Subway. The station is on Fort Washington Avenue with entrances at 175th Street and 177th Street, the latter one block south of the bus station. A pedestrian tunnel, maintained by the Port Authority of New York and New Jersey, links the bus terminal to the subway station. This tunnel is closed at night.

Bus service
On September 20, 2017, Greyhound announced that it would be providing service to the station starting September 27, while keeping the Port Authority Bus Terminal as its primary New York City location.

, the bus lines detailed below serve the terminal for the New York City Transit Authority, New Jersey Transit, and Coach USA (Rockland Coaches and Short Line). Service is also provided by Spanish Transportation with its Express Service jitneys. Additionally, some OurBus routes serve the George Washington Bridge Bus Station.

MTA Regional Bus Operations 
Ten local MTA Regional Bus Operations routes stop at a lower level and on the streets outside the station. The  stops on Fort Washington Avenue, while the  stop on Broadway. The  stop on 178th and 179th Streets between Fort Washington Avenue and Broadway. All routes are ADA-accessible.

New Jersey Transit

Coach USA

Rockland Coaches

Short Line Bus

See also
Port Authority Bus Terminal
Journal Square Transportation Center
George Washington Bridge Plaza, across the bridge in Fort Lee, New Jersey

References

External links

GW Bridge Bus Station home page
NJ Transit route finder 
Rockland Coaches 
ShortLine Bus
Boarding Area from Google Maps Street View
Waiting Room from Google Maps Street View

 Washington Heights, Manhattan
 Bus stations in New York City
 Port Authority of New York and New Jersey
 Transit hubs serving New Jersey
 NJ Transit Bus Operations
 NJ Transit bus stations
 Transportation buildings and structures in Manhattan
 Pier Luigi Nervi buildings
 Modernist architecture in New York City
 1963 establishments in New York City
 Transport infrastructure completed in 1963